Pascal Clarhaut is a French classical trumpeter, teacher, solo trumpet of the orchestre de l'Opéra national de Paris.

Life 
Originally from the North of France, he studied music at Leers, Roubaix and Tourcoing before moving to Orléans and then to the Conservatoire de Lyon where he unanimously obtained a first prize for trumpet in Pierre Dutot's class. He was then appointed principal cornet and then principal trumpet within the orchestre philharmonique de Strasbourg. In 1991, he was appointed principal trumpet at the orchestre de l'Opéra national de Paris, a position he still held in 2017.

Thanks to "his recognized pedagogical qualities", and in order to "share his knowledge" he regularly leads master classes in France and abroad.

Concerts, premieres and recordings 
Clarhaut mainly plays works by 20th century composers. For example:
 in 1996, he participated in the premiere of composer Gilles Silvestrini's Descant for trumpet, French horn, trombone and string orchestra; with Hervé Joulain (French horn), Jacques Mauger (trombone) and the orchestra of the Flaine festival conducted by Victor Costa. The work will later be recorded under the direction of conductor Laurent Petitgirard.
 in 1997, he was the main interpreter with Viviane Loriaut (organ) of the disc Lumière, trompette et orgue, works by several 20th century composers, including the Czech composer Petr Eben and the French Jean Rivier. (reference n°|BMG/RCA CD-47018)
 in 2004, he is one of the recording instrumentalists of Stravinski's L'Histoire du soldat. 
 in 2005, he is one of the instrumentalists of the composer André David's work: Musique de chambre avec clavier; with Marc Sieffert(alto saxophone), Christine Marchais (piano), Jean Fessard (percussions) and Pierrick Antoine (little organ) CD MA051201

References

External links 
 His biography on the website of the ensemble musical Crescendo.
 Discography (Discogs)
 Trini - Nantes Philharmonie - Calyps'Atlantique - Pascal Clarhaut (YouTube)

 

French classical trumpeters
Male trumpeters
French National Academy of Dramatic Arts alumni
Date of birth missing (living people)
Place of birth missing (living people)
Living people
20th-century French musicians
21st-century French musicians
21st-century trumpeters
20th-century French male musicians
21st-century French male musicians
Year of birth missing (living people)